This is a list of Adventures of Superman episodes.

The first two seasons, comprising 52 episodes and half of the series' whole, were filmed in black and white. In 1954, series producer Whitney Ellsworth insisted on filming in color, as some home viewers were beginning to purchase color television sets. However, these episodes were still transmitted in black and white. Also beginning with season three, the series began to take on the lighthearted, whimsical tone of the Superman comic books of the 1950s. The villains were often caricatured, Runyonesque gangsters played with tongue in cheek. Violence on the show was toned down further. The only gunfire that occurred was aimed at Superman, and of course the bullets bounced off. Superman was less likely to engage in fisticuffs with the villains. On occasions when Superman did use physical force, he would take crooks out in a single karate-style chop or, if he happened to have two criminals in hand, banging their heads together. More often than not, the villains were likely to knock themselves out fleeing Superman. By then very popular to viewers, Jimmy Olsen was now being played as the show's comic foil to Superman. Many of the plots featured him and Lois Lane being captured, only to be rescued at the last minute by Superman.

Scripts for the last season did not always hit the campy lows of the previous two years and reestablished a bit of the seriousness of the show, often with science fiction elements such as a Kryptonite-powered robot (a left-over prop from "The Bowery Boys Meet the Monsters"), atomic explosions, and impregnable metal cubes. In one of the last episodes, "The Perils of Superman" (a takeoff on The Perils of Pauline), there was indeed deadly peril straight out of the movie serials: Lois gagged and tied to a set of railroad tracks with a speeding train bearing down on her, Perry White nearly sawed in half while tied to a log, Jimmy in a runaway car headed for a cliff, and Clark Kent immersed in a vat of acid. This was one of three episodes directed by George Reeves himself in an attempt to inject some new life into the series. Noel Neill's hair was dyed a bright red for this season, though the color change was not apparent in the initial black-and-white broadcasts. Although Reeves's efforts did not save the series from cancellation, "The Perils of Superman" is regarded by some as one of the best episodes. The numbering scheme in the following list is derived from the purely consecutive numbering used in Superman: Serial to Cereal.

Series overview 
All six seasons of this series have been released on four DVD box sets by Warner Bros. Home Video.

Episodes 
The following list of episodes is compiled from the websites IMDb.com (Internet Movie Database), Supermanhomepage.com, Answers.com, and Fandango.com.

Season 1 (1952–53)

Season 2 (1953–54)

Season 3 (1955)

Season 4 (1956)

Season 5 (1957)

Season 6 (1958)

References

Sources 

Superman: Serial to Cereal, by Gary H. Grossman, 1976
Adventures of Superman. Complete series DVD. Warner Bros. Entertainment Inc. 2006, 2007.

Lists of American fantasy television series episodes
Superman television series episodes
Lists of DC Comics television series episodes